Nazeriyeh (also Romanized as Nāz̧erīyeh) is a village in Miyan Velayat Rural District, in the Central District of Mashhad County, Razavi Khorasan Province, Iran. At the 2006 census, its population was 1,900, in 418 families.

References 

Populated places in Mashhad County